A  in Japanese architecture is the road approaching either a Shinto shrine or a Buddhist temple. Its point of origin is usually straddled in the first case by a Shinto torii, in the second by a Buddhist sanmon, gates which mark the beginning of the shrine's or temple territory. The word  can refer both to a path or road, and to the path of one's life's efforts. There can also be stone lanterns and other decorations at any point along its course.

The famous Omotesandō district in Tokyo, for example, takes its name from the nearby main access path to Meiji Shrine where an ura-sandō also used to exist.

Gallery

See also
 Shendao, a decorated road to a grave of an emperor or another dignitary in China
 Glossary of Shinto

References

Architecture in Japan
Shinto
Footpaths
Buddhist temples in Japan
Roads in Japan
Shinto architecture